Secret (lit.: Secret) was a Soviet Russian rock and roll band founded in 1982 in Leningrad. The band's musical style and image were inspired from 1950s and 1960s western music, in particular by The Beatles. The band's name was inspired by the Beatles song 'Do You Want to Know a Secret?'. Secret called themselves a "Beat Quartet" and were, along with Bravo, a part of Soviet rock and roll revival of 1980s.

The original lineup lasted until 1990, when frontman Maxim Leonidov emigrated to Israel. The band continued with different lineups without great success. Since 1997 the original lineup has occasionally performed together including for anniversary shows in 2003 and 2007.

Many Secret hits of the 1980s still receive a lot of airplay on Russian FM stations.

Original members
 Maxim Leonidov — vocals, rhythm-guitar, keyboards (1983–1990, 1997, 1999, 2003, 2007, 2012, 2013—present)
 Nikolai Fomenko — vocals, bass-guitar (1983–1996, 1997, 1999, 2003, 2007, 2010–present)
 Andrey Zabludovskiy — vocals, lead-guitar, viola (1983–present)
 Aleksey Murashov — vocals, drums, percussion (1983–1998, 1999, 2003, 2007, 2010–present)

Discography

References

External links

Official website 
Unofficial site of the band 
Unofficial history of the band 

Musical groups established in 1983
Russian rock music groups
Musical groups from Saint Petersburg
1983 establishments in the Soviet Union
Soviet rock music groups